Albert George Froehlich (November 12, 1887 – September 1, 1916) was an American Major League Baseball catcher. Al Froelich was long misidentified as Ben Froelich until 2014.

References

External links

1880s births
1941 deaths
Major League Baseball catchers
Philadelphia Phillies players
Sportspeople from Brooklyn
Baseball players from New York City